"Get Up" is a hip-hop song by American recording artist Nate Dogg, released as the first single from his third self-titled studio album Nate Dogg (2003). The song features additional vocals from American rapper Eve and the song is produced by DJ Quik.

Track listings
CD single
"Get Up" (Amended Version) (featuring Eve) – 3:50
"Get Up" (Original Version) (featuring Eve) – 3:50
"Get Up" (Amended W/o Rap) – 3:50
"Get Up" (Instrumental) – 3:50
"Get Up" (TV Track) – 3:50
"Get Up" (Acapella) (featuring Eve) – 3:47

Charts

Release history

References

2003 singles
2003 songs
Elektra Records singles
Nate Dogg songs
Eve (rapper) songs
Song recordings produced by DJ Quik
Songs written by Eve (rapper)
Songs written by Nate Dogg
Songs written by DJ Quik